Hold That Girl is a 1934 American comedy film directed by Hamilton MacFadden and written by Dudley Nichols and Lamar Trotti. The film stars James Dunn, Claire Trevor, Alan Edwards, Gertrude Michael, John Davidson and Robert McWade. The film was released on March 24, 1934, by Fox Film Corporation.

Cast        
James Dunn as Barney Sullivan
Claire Trevor as Tonie Bellamy
Alan Edwards as Tom Mallory
Gertrude Michael as Dorothy Lamont
John Davidson as Ackroyd
Robert McWade as McCloy
Effie Ellsler as Grandmother
Jay Ward as Warren

References

External links 
 

1930s feminist films
1934 films
Fox Film films
American comedy films
1934 comedy films
Films directed by Hamilton MacFadden
American black-and-white films
1930s English-language films
1930s American films